Vriesea chrysostachys is a plant species in the genus Vriesea. It is an epiphyte native to Colombia, Peru, and Trinidad.

Cultivars
 Vriesea 'Pactole'

References

chrysostachys
Flora of Colombia
Flora of Peru
Flora of Trinidad and Tobago
Epiphytes
Plants described in 1881